Philip Sutcliffe Sr. (born 10 November 1959) is a former boxer and two-time Olympian. He competed at the 1980 and 1984 Olympic Games. Additionally, he was the winner of four national titles in Ireland, two at bantamweight and one each at lightflyweight and flyweight, as well as bronze medals in two successive European Amateur Boxing Championships, in Germany in 1977 and 1979.

His son Philip Sutcliffe Jr. is also a notable boxer.

1980 Olympic results
Below is the record of Philip Sutcliffe, an Irish bantamweight boxer who competed at the 1980 Moscow Olympics:

 Round of 64: bye
 Round of 32: lost to Daniel Zaragoza (Mexico) by decision, 0-5

References

1959 births
Living people
Olympic boxers of Ireland
Irish male boxers
Boxers at the 1980 Summer Olympics
Boxers at the 1984 Summer Olympics
Bantamweight boxers